The 1995 CECAFA Cup was the 21st edition of the tournament. It was held in Uganda, and was won by Zanzibar. The matches were played between November 26–December 9.

Uganda sent two teams: Uganda A and Uganda B.

Group stage

Group A

Group B

Knockout stage

Semi-finals

Zanzibar won on penalty shootout.

Third place match

Final

References
RSSSF archives

CECAFA Cup
International association football competitions hosted by Uganda
1995 in Ugandan football